Anna Weis (born March 24, 1998 in Fort Lauderdale, Florida) is an American sailor. She qualified to represent Team USA at the 2020 Summer Olympics in Tokyo, competing with Riley Gibbs in the Nacra 17 (Mixed Two-Person Multihull) event.

Career highlights 

 7th, Laser Radial, Laser Radial Youth Worlds (Kingston, CAN), 2015
 8th, Laser Radial, Laser Radial Youth Worlds (Dun Laoghaire, IRE), 2016
 1st, Laser Radial, US Women’s Singlehanded National Championship (Mentor-on-the-Lake, OH, USA), 2016
 8th, Laser Radial, US Singlehanded National Championship (Mentor-on-the-Lake, OH, USA), 2016
 Women’s Singlehanded National Champion (2016)
 11th, Nacra 17, SWC Series Round 1 – Miami (Miami, USA), 2017
 1st, Pan American Games Lima 2019 (Paracas, PER), 2019
 12th, Nacra 17, Trofeo S.A.R. Princesa Sofia (Palma de Mallorca, ESP), 2019
 15th, Nacra 17, Hempel World Cup Series – Round 2, Miami (Miami, USA), 2019

References

External links 
 
 
 
 

1998 births
Living people
American female sailors (sport)
Olympic sailors of the United States
Sailors at the 2020 Summer Olympics – Nacra 17
Pan American Games medalists in sailing
Pan American Games gold medalists for the United States
Sailors at the 2019 Pan American Games
Medalists at the 2019 Pan American Games
Sportspeople from Atlanta
21st-century American women